Bismarck Wilhelm du Plessis (born 22 May 1984) is a South African professional rugby union player, who plays for the  in the United Rugby Championship and for the  in the Currie Cup. He is widely acknowledged to be one of the best "Hookers" of his time, both in club and country performances.

Career
A native of the town of Bethlehem in the Free State province, Bismarck du Plessis made his debut for the Sharks in Super Rugby (then the Super 12) in 2005. As he plays hooker and played in the same team as South Africa's past captain, John Smit, for much of his career he had been a backup to Smit; however, this changed when Smit moved to tighthead prop. Before Smit's change of position, Du Plessis nonetheless played in Super Rugby and the Currie Cup whenever Smit was unavailable, and in 2007 was selected to play for South Africa in the Tri Nations Series. He made his debut for South Africa as a substitute in the same game against Australia in Sydney in which his older brother, Jannie, who was in the starting XV, also made his Springboks debut. The Du Plessis brothers became the 23rd set of brothers to earn caps for South Africa at rugby union.

Following an illness to Pierre Spies, Bismarck du Plessis was called into South Africa's squad for the 2007 Rugby World Cup; his brother Jannie was a later addition to the squad, replacing BJ Botha, who injured a knee in South Africa's final pool match against the USA.

During the 2008 end-of-year Test series, the Springboks moved Smit to tighthead in order to accommodate both him and the younger, faster Du Plessis in the front row together; this change has continued through the 2009 Super 14 season and into the Boks' 2009 Test season.

After South Africa's second game of the 2008 Tri Nations Series, against New Zealand, Du Plessis was cited for an eye-gouge on New Zealand's Adam Thomson. At the subsequent disciplinary hearing, which was the first of his career, the judicial officer found that his action had been "careless", not deliberate, and imposed a three-week suspension, a significantly lower penalty than the three-to-six months' suspensions routinely imposed for deliberate eye-gouging.

2012–2015
Du Plessis was selected for the 2011 Rugby World Cup along with his brother Jannie. He came off the bench against Wales in which South Africa won 17–16. He then won a man of the match performance in June 2012 against England in the second test and also scored a try as the Springboks won 36-27 thanks to a late try from right winger JP Pietersen. During the 2013 Rugby Championship, Du Plessis received two yellow cards in a match against New Zealand and was then issued a red card. The IRB later admitted an error in one of the yellow cards. This red card was later overturned by the IRB and struck from Du Plessis' record. Bismarck has since featured prominently for the Springboks, being first-choice hooker. He was also selected for the 2015 Rugby World Cup.

Notes

References

External links

Bismarck du Plessis at Genslin Springboks

1984 births
Living people
People from Bethlehem, Free State
Afrikaner people
South African people of Dutch descent
South African rugby union players
South Africa international rugby union players
Rugby union hookers
Alumni of Grey College, Bloemfontein
Sharks (Currie Cup) players
Sharks (rugby union) players
Free State Cheetahs players
South African expatriates in France
Expatriate rugby union players in France
Montpellier Hérault Rugby players
Bulls (rugby union) players
Blue Bulls players
Rugby union players from the Free State (province)